The 2021 Prairie View A&M Panthers football team represented Prairie View A&M University in the 2021 NCAA Division I FCS football season. The Panthers played their home games at Panther Stadium at Blackshear Field in Prairie View, Texas, and competed in the West Division of the Southwestern Athletic Conference (SWAC). They were led by fourth-year head coach Eric Dooley

Schedule

Game summaries

at Texas Southern

at Incarnate Word

Houston Baptist

vs. Grambling State

Arkansas–Pine Bluff

at Bethune–Cookman

at Southern

Alabama State

at Alcorn State

at No. 16 (FBS) Texas A&M

Mississippi Valley State

References

Prairie View AandM
Prairie View A&M Panthers football seasons
Prairie View AandM football